The Men's scratch event of the 2008 UCI Track Cycling World Championships was held on 26 March 2008.

Results

References

Men's scratch
UCI Track Cycling World Championships – Men's scratch